

Events

February events
 February 15 – The Western Railroad of Massachusetts is chartered to build a railroad between Worcester, Massachusetts, and the New York state line.

March events 
 March 15 – Andover and Wilmington Railroad is incorporated to build a branch from the Boston and Lowell Railroad at Wilmington, Massachusetts, north to Andover, Massachusetts.

April events
 April 29 – The Utica and Schenectady Railroad is chartered.

May events
 May 6 – Grand Junction Railway and London and Birmingham Railway are both authorised by the Parliament of the United Kingdom.

June events
 June 6 – Andrew Jackson rides the Baltimore and Ohio Railroad from Ellicott Mills to Baltimore, first US President to travel by rail during his term of office.

September events
 September – Eleazer Lord becomes first president of the Erie Railroad.

November events
 November 8 – The Hightstown rail accident in New Jersey is the first to involve passenger deaths.

December events
 December 17 – Camden and Amboy Railroad in New Jersey opens throughout.

Unknown date events
 Tredegar Iron Works, an American steam locomotive manufacturer, is formed in Virginia.
 The Monkland and Kirkintilloch Railway operates a wagon ferry on the Forth and Clyde Canal in Scotland.
 Paterson and Hudson River Railroad is chartered.

Births

March births 
 March 6 – William Stroudley, locomotive and carriage superintendent for Highland Railway 1865–1870; locomotive superintendent at London, Brighton and South Coast Railway's Brighton Works 1870–1889, is born (d. 1889).

Deaths

April deaths
 April 22 – Richard Trevithick, English inventor and steam locomotive builder (b. 1771).

References